Fillip Alekseevich Parusinov (November 27, 1893 – October 25, 1973) was a Soviet army group commander. He fought in the Imperial Russian Army during World War I before going over to the Bolsheviks in the subsequent civil war. He was promoted to Polkovnik (colonel) in 1935, Kombrig (brigade commander) in 1937, Komdiv (division commander) in 1938 and Komkor (corps commander) in 1939. He fought in the wars against Finland, Nazi Germany and the Empire of Japan. He retired in 1956 at the age of 63.

Literature
 Жуков Г. К. Воспоминания и размышления. В 3-х тт. — 10-е изд., доп. по рукописи автора. — М.: Новости, 1990. — С. 274—277. —  ; 5-7020-0075-7
 
 Командный и начальствующий состав Красной Армии в 1940—1941 гг. Структура и кадры центрального аппарата HКО СССР, военных округов и общевойсковых армий. Документы и материалы. — М.; СПб.: Летний сад, 2005. — 
 Краснознамённый Киевский. Очерки истории Краснознамённого Киевского военного округа (1919—1979). — 2-е изд., испр. и доп. — Киев: Изд-во политической литературы Украины, 1979.
 Мельтюхов М. И. Упущенный шанс Сталина. Советский Союз и борьба за Европу: 1939—1941. — М.: Вече, 2000. — 
 Мельтюхов М. И. Советско-польские войны. Военно-политическое противостояние 1918—1939 гг. — Ч. 3: Сентябрь 1939 года. Война с запада. — М.: Яуза; Эксмо, 2001. — 
 Военный энциклопедический словарь. — М.: Воениздат, 1984.

1893 births
1973 deaths
People from Bobrovsky Uyezd
Bolsheviks
Soviet lieutenant generals
Frunze Military Academy alumni
Russian military personnel of World War I
Soviet military personnel of the Russian Civil War
Soviet military personnel of the Winter War
Soviet military personnel of World War II
Recipients of the Order of Lenin